Picovirinae is a subfamily of viruses in the order Caudovirales, in the family Salasmaviridae. Bacteria serve as natural hosts. There are two genera and seven species in this subfamily.

Taxonomy
The following genera and species are recognized:
Beecentumtrevirus
Bacillus phage Nf
Bacillus virus B103
Bacillus virus Goe1
Salasvirus
Bacillus virus Goe6
Bacillus virus Gxv1
Bacillus virus phi29
Bacillus virus PZA

Structure
Viruses in Picovirinae are non-enveloped, with icosahedral or prolate heads of about 50–55 nm in diameter, and short tails. Genomes are linear, double stranded DNA, and are relatively small (between 16–20 kbp)-hence the term pico-virinae. Picoviruses package linear, monomeric genomes with a terminal protein covalently attached to each end.

Life cycle
Viral replication is cytoplasmic. Entry into the host cell is achieved by adsorption into the host cell. Replication follows the DNA strand displacement model. DNA-templated transcription is the method of transcription. Bacteria serve as the natural host. Transmission routes are passive diffusion.

References

External links
 Viralzone: Picovirinae
 ICTV

 
Virus subfamilies